Chairmen of the Senate of Czechoslovakia.

Below is a list of office-holders:

Sources
 

Czechoslovakia, Senate
Speakers
Czechoslovakia